Rubén Darío Murillo Minota (born ) is a Colombian male track cyclist. He competed in the team sprint event at the 2015 UCI Track Cycling World Championships.

References

External links
 Profile at cyclingarchives.com

1990 births
Living people
Colombian track cyclists
Colombian male cyclists
Place of birth missing (living people)
Pan American Games medalists in cycling
Pan American Games gold medalists for Colombia
Cyclists at the 2019 Pan American Games
Medalists at the 2019 Pan American Games
Sportspeople from Antioquia Department
20th-century Colombian people
21st-century Colombian people
Competitors at the 2014 Central American and Caribbean Games
Competitors at the 2018 Central American and Caribbean Games
Competitors at the 2014 South American Games
Competitors at the 2018 South American Games
Competitors at the 2022 South American Games
South American Games gold medalists for Colombia
South American Games silver medalists for Colombia
South American Games medalists in cycling